This is a list of universities and other tertiary institutions in Dominica:

Public Institutions
Dominica State College: A public two year institution in Stock Farm, Dominica 
The University of the West Indies has an Open Campus site in Roseau

Private Institutions
All Saints University School of Medicine: A private medical school in Roseau, Dominica 
International University for Graduate Studies: A private university in Portsmouth, Dominica 
New World University: A private university in Roseau, Dominica 
St. Joseph University: A private university in Roseau, Dominica 
St. Nicholas University: School of Veterinary Medicine: A private university in Morne Daniel near Roseau, Dominica

See also 
 List of universities by country

Dominica
Universities
 List
Dominica